The Reformed Church in Zimbabwe was founded by Dutch Reformed Church in South Africa missionaries on the 9th of September 1891. Andrew A. Louw begun to preach in the area near Morgenster among Shona people. The worship language of churches was Afrikaans and English. Later the denomination expanded among Nyanja people. In 1999 a new mission field was opened in Binga District. 
The young Church was administered from South Africa under the Dutch Reformed Church Cape Synod, eventually,  the  African  Reformed  Church  in  Rhodesia  came  into being,  as  an  indigenous  and  independent  church,  under  the  control  of  church  councils,  four presbyteries  and  a  synod. In  1977  it  became  the  fully  autonomous  African  Reformed  Church. Soon  after  the  country's  independence  in  1980,  the  name  was  changed  to  Reformed  Church  in Zimbabwe. The R.C.Z subscribes to the  Heidelberg  Catechism,  Belgic  Confession,  and  the  Canons  of  Dort  as  its doctrinal  standard.    
The  R.C.Z  is  a  member  of  the  World  Council  of Churches  (WCC  entry),  the  Zimbabwe  Council  of  Churches.  In  addition  to  its  various  church activities,  the  church  has  a  special  concern  for  its  schools namely Henry Murray School for  the  deaf  in Morgenster, and  the  Margaretha  Hugo  School (Copota) for  the  blind in Zimuto.  The  RCZ  is also the responsible authority for a number of primary and secondary schools,  a  teacher-training  college,  Murray  Theological  College and the Reformed Church University (RCU) in  Masvingo,  as  well  as two  hospitals  and  several  clinics.

The  RCZ  is  a  Reformed  Faith-based  organization. The  Reformed  faith  is  centered  on  the  Bible and  believer's  personal  relationship  with  God  through  Christ. Reformation  stresses  on  divine grace  and  justification  by  faith. Accordingly,  priesthood  belongs  to  every  believer  and  not to  the  religious  hierarchy. Scripture  and  only Scripture  is  the  sole  religious  authority  for  the  Christian. Reformation  is  therefore  continual and holistic  based  on  new  revelations  revealed  to  the  believer  and  the  church  through  the  Word  of God.

By 2019 had over 80 congregations and 250 house fellowships and about 100,000 members, the Church continues the grow especially in the urban areas of Gweru, Kwekwe, Masvingo and Harere.

Notable People

Rev A A Louw the founding minister of the RCZ, Rev H Murray a minister of Scottish heritage initiated the establishment of Murray Theological College, Ezra Shumba the first minister trained at Murray Theological College.

.

References

External links 
Church in Zimbabwe

 
Reformed denominations in Zimbabwe
Members of the World Communion of Reformed Churches
Religious organizations established in 1891
1891 establishments in the British Empire